Bhadrachalam was a Lok Sabha parliamentary constituency in the state of Andhra Pradesh in India till 2008.

Members of Parliament

Election results

2004

See also
Bhadrachalam
List of Constituencies of the Lok Sabha

References

Khammam district
1967 establishments in Andhra Pradesh
Constituencies established in 1967
Former Lok Sabha constituencies of Andhra Pradesh
Former constituencies of the Lok Sabha
2008 disestablishments in India
Constituencies disestablished in 2008